Vicenzi S.p.A. is an Italian food company based in San Giovanni Lupatoto. It was founded in 1905 by Matilde Vicenzi.

Vicenzi produces a range of biscuits and cakes. With four production facilities in Europe, the company exports products to about 70 countries and offers private-label production services.

In 2005 Vicenzi bought from Parmalat the bakery plant of Nusco, opened in 1984.

References

External links 
 Company website

Food and drink companies established in 1905
Companies based in Veneto
Italian companies established in 1905
Confectionery companies of Italy